Lysogorsky (masculine), Lysogorskaya (feminine), or Lysogorskoye (neuter) may refer to:
Lysogorsky District, a district of Saratov Oblast, Russia
Lysogorsky (rural locality) (Lysogorskaya, Lysogorskoye), name of several rural localities in Russia

See also
Lysye Gory